{{Infobox former subdivision
| native_name            = Семиреченская область''Semirechyenskaya oblast| conventional_long_name = Semirechyenskaya Oblast
| common_name            = Semirechyenskaya Oblast
| subdivision            = Oblast
| nation                 = Russia
| status_text            = 
| capital                = Verniy
| latd                   = 
| latm                   = 
| latNS                  = 
| longd                  = 
| longm                  = 
| longEW                 = 
| year_start             = 1867
| date_start             = 23 July
| year_end               = 1924
| date_end               = 27 October
| event_start            = 
| event_end              = 
| image_flag             = 
| image_coat             = Coat_of_Arms_of_Semirechye_Province.png
| image_map              = Map of Semirechensk Oblast, 1913.gif
| flag_type              = 
| flag                   = 
| p1                     = Oblast of the Siberian Kirghiz
| flag_p1                = Flag of Russia.svg
| p2                     = Khanate of Kokand
| flag_p2                = Flag of the Turkestan (Kokand) Autonomy.svg
| s1                     = Turkestan ASSR
| flag_s1                = Turkestan Autonomous SSR Flag.svg
| s2                     = 
| flag_s2                = 
| today                  = KazakhstanKyrgyzstan
| demonym                = 
}}
The Semirechyenskaya Oblast''' was an oblast (province) of the Russian Empire. It corresponded approximately to most of present-day southeastern Kazakhstan and northeastern Kyrgyzstan. It was created out of the territories of the northern part of the Khanate of Kokand that had been part of the Kazakh Khanate. The name "Semirechye" ("Seven Rivers") itself is the direct Russian translation of the historical region of Jetysu. Its site of government was Verniy (now named Almaty).

The Russian government seized the Semirechyenskaya region in 1854, and created the province the same year. It was administered as part of Governor-Generalship of the Steppes (before 1882 it was known as the Governor-Generalship of the Western Siberia) between 1854 and 1867 and again between 1882 and 1899, and part of Russian Turkistan between 1867 and 1882 and again between 1899 and 1917. Russian control of the region was recognized by the Treaty of Saint Petersburg (1881) between Russia and China

On April 30, 1918 the region became part of the Turkestan ASSR. On October 27, 1924 as a result of the national-territorial reorganisation of Soviet Central Asia, the northern part of the region became part of the Kirgiz ASSR (already created in 1920 and renamed the Kazakh ASSR in 1925 and then established as the union-level Kazakh Soviet Socialist Republic), while the southern part became the Kara-Kirghiz Autonomous Oblast (eventually the Kirghiz ASSR and SR) within the RSFSR .

Geography

It covered a region called Semiriche (southeastern Kazakhstan and northern Kyrgyzstan), the Chui Valley and the mountainous regions of Tien Shan.

It was found in the southeastern part of the Turkestan Governor-General. In the north it bordered the Semipalatinsk region, from the south and east - China (on the Bedel Pass to the southwest by the Tian Shan Range),and from the west the Fergana and Syr Darya oblasts. The oblast covered the territory of lakes Balkhash, Issyk-Kul, Ala-Kul.

Administrative division 
As of 1897, the Semirechye Oblast was divided into 6 uyezds:

Demographics
As of 1897, 987,863 people populated the oblast. Kazakhs and Kyrgyz (united as Kirgiz in estimation) constituted the majority of the population. Significant minorities consisted of Russians and Taranchi. Total Turkic speaking were 878,209 (88,9%).

Ethnic groups in 1897

See also
Russian Turkestan
Semirechye Cossacks

References

 
Oblasts of the Russian Empire
Central Asia in the Russian Empire
1854 establishments in the Russian Empire